French legislative elections took place on 14 June and 21 June 1981 to elect the seventh National Assembly of the Fifth Republic.

On 10 May 1981 François Mitterrand was elected President of France. He became the first Socialist to win this post under universal suffrage. It was also the first occasion of alternance (between the right and the left) in government during the Fifth Republic.

The new head of state nominated Pierre Mauroy to lead a Socialist cabinet. He then dissolved the National Assembly so that he could rely on a parliamentary majority. The left had lost the 1978 legislative election and the full term of the National Assembly would have expired in 1983.

Knocked out after its defeat in the recent presidential election, the right campaigned against the concentration of the powers and the possible nomination of Communist ministers. Yet, it suffered from the economic crisis, the will for change amongst the electorate, and the rivalry between the RPR leader Jacques Chirac and the previous UDF President Valéry Giscard d'Estaing. The formation of the Union for a New Majority appeared as a false reconciliation and so, had not convinced voters.  Furthermore, as the French Communist Party (PCF) had been declining, and was no longer the dominant party of the Left, it did not seem to be a real danger.

The Communist leaders were very disappointed by the result of their candidate, Georges Marchais, in the presidential election, and very worried by the legislative elections. During the presidential campaign, the PCF had denounced the "turn towards the right" of the Socialist Party (PS), in vain. It understood that Mitterrand was ready to win his bet, expressed in the 1972 Congress of the Socialist International, to capture 3 of the 5 million PCF voters. Perceiving the great hope of the left-wing voters after Mitterrand's election, Marchais signed a "contract of government" with the First Secretary of the PS Lionel Jospin.
     
The Socialists achieved the biggest electoral success of their history. This result marked the triumph of Mitterrand's strategy. Like the Gaullist UDR in 1968, the PS obtained an absolute parliamentary majority. The Communist decline noted at the presidential election was confirmed. The PCF obtained its poorest result since 1936 and lost the half of its MPs, most of them to the PS. However, four Communists became members of Pierre Mauroy's government. This was the first PCF governmental participation since 1947. The two right-wing parliamentary parties lost the half of their seats too. This result earned the nickname "the pink wave" from the press.

Results

|-
! style="background-color:#E9E9E9;text-align:left;vertical-align:top;" rowspan=2 colspan=3 width=600 |Parties and coalitions
! style="background-color:#E9E9E9;text-align:center;" colspan=2 |1st round
! style="background-color:#E9E9E9;text-align:center;" colspan=2 |2nd round
! style="background-color:#E9E9E9" rowspan=2|Total seats
|-
! style="background-color:#E9E9E9;text-align:right;" |Votes
! style="background-color:#E9E9E9;text-align:right;" |%
! style="background-color:#E9E9E9;text-align:right;" |Votes
! style="background-color:#E9E9E9;text-align:right;" |%
|-
|style="background-color:#E75480"|
| style="text-align:left;" | Socialist Party (Parti socialiste) including the Movement of Left Radicals (Mouvement des radicaux de gauche)
| style="text-align:right;" | PS
| style="text-align:right;" | 9,432,362
| style="text-align:right;" | 37.52
| style="text-align:right;" | 9,198,332
| style="text-align:right;" | 49.25
| style="text-align:right;" | 283 (14 MRG)
|-
|style="background-color:#FF0000"|
| style="text-align:left;" | French Communist Party (Parti communiste français)
| style="text-align:right;" | PCF
| style="text-align:right;" | 4,065,540
| style="text-align:right;" | 16.17
| style="text-align:right;" | 1,303,587
| style="text-align:right;" | 6.98
| style="text-align:right;" | 44
|-
|style="background-color:#DA7B8B"|
| style="text-align:left;" | Miscellaneous Left
| style="text-align:right;" | DVG
| style="text-align:right;" | 183,010
| style="text-align:right;" | 0.73
| style="text-align:right;" | 97,066
| style="text-align:right;" | 0.52
| style="text-align:right;" | 6 
|- style="background-color:pink"
|style="text-align:left;" colspan=2| Total "Presidential Majority" (Left)
|
| style="text-align:right;" | 13,680,912
| style="text-align:right;" | 54.42
| style="text-align:right;" | 10,598,985
| style="text-align:right;" | 56.75
| style="text-align:right;" | 333
|-
|style="background-color:#0000C8"|
| style="text-align:left;" | Rally for the Republic (Rassemblement pour la République)
| style="text-align:right;" | RPR
| style="text-align:right;" | 5,231,269
| style="text-align:right;" | 20.81
| style="text-align:right;" | 4,174,302
| style="text-align:right;" | 22.35
| style="text-align:right;" | 85
|-
|style="background-color:#00CCCC"|
| style="text-align:left;" | Union for French Democracy ( union pour la démocratie française)
| style="text-align:right;" | UDF
| style="text-align:right;" | 4,827,437
| style="text-align:right;" | 19.20
| style="text-align:right;" | 3,489,363
| style="text-align:right;" | 18.68
| style="text-align:right;" | 62
|-
|style="background-color:#4C4CB0"|
| style="text-align:left;" | Miscellaneous Right
| style="text-align:right;" | DVD
| style="text-align:right;" | 704,788
| style="text-align:right;" | 2.80
| style="text-align:right;" | 408,861
| style="text-align:right;" | 2.19
| style="text-align:right;" | 11 (5 CNIP)
|- style="background-color:lightblue"
|style="text-align:left;" colspan=2|Total "Union for a New Majority" (Right)
|
| style="text-align:right;" | 10,763,494
| style="text-align:right;" | 42.81
| style="text-align:right;" | 8,072,526
| style="text-align:right;" | 43.23
| style="text-align:right;" | 158
|-
|style="background-color:#C41E3A"|
| style="text-align:left;" | Far-Left
|
| style="text-align:right;" | 334,674
| style="text-align:right;" | 1.33
| style="text-align:right;" | 3,517
| style="text-align:right;" | 0.02
| style="text-align:right;" | -
|-
|style="background-color:#77ff77"|
| style="text-align:left;" | Ecologists
| style="text-align:right;" | ECO
| style="text-align:right;" | 271,688
| style="text-align:right;" | 1.08
| style="text-align:right;" | -
| style="text-align:right;" | -
| style="text-align:right;" | -
|-
|style="background-color:#0D378A"|
| style="text-align:left;" | National Front (Front national)
| style="text-align:right;" | FN
| style="text-align:right;" | 90,422
| style="text-align:right;" | 0.36
| style="text-align:right;" | -
| style="text-align:right;" | -
| style="text-align:right;" | -
|-
|
| style="text-align:left;" | Total
|
| style="text-align:right;" | 25,141,190
| style="text-align:right;" | 100.00
| style="text-align:right;" | 18,675,028
| style="text-align:right;" | 100.00
| style="text-align:right;" | 491
|-
| style="text-align:left;" colspan=8 | Abstention: 29.65% (1st round); 25.54% (2nd round)
|}

National Assembly by Parliamentary Group

1981
1981 elections in France